Lamesley railway station served the village of Lamesley, Tyne and Wear, England from 1868 to 1959 on the East Coast Main Line.

History 
The station opened on 1 December 1868 by the North Eastern Railway. It closed to passengers on 4 June 1945 and closed completely on 14 September 1959.

References

External links 

Disused railway stations in Tyne and Wear
Former North Eastern Railway (UK) stations
Railway stations in Great Britain opened in 1868
Railway stations in Great Britain closed in 1945
1868 establishments in England
1959 disestablishments in England